The 1933 Irish general election to the 8th Dáil was held on Tuesday, 24 January following the dissolution of the 7th Dáil on 2 January. The general election took place in 30 parliamentary constituencies throughout the Irish Free State for 153 seats in Dáil Éireann.

The 8th Dáil met at Leinster House on 8 February to nominate the President of the Executive Council and Executive Council of the Irish Free State for appointment by the Governor-General Domhnall Ua Buachalla. Outgoing president Éamon de Valera was re-appointed leading a Fianna Fáil government, which fell one seat short of an overall majority.

Campaign

Result

|}

Voting summary

Seats summary

Government formation
Excluding the Ceann Comhairle, Fianna Fáil won exactly half the seats and formed the 7th Executive Council of the Irish Free State with support from the Labour Party. Fianna Fáil eventually won enough by-elections to govern without Labour Party support.

First time TDs
James Burke
John A. Costello
Patrick Daly
Robert Davitt
Hugh Doherty
Eamon Donnelly
Séamus Keely
Patrick Kehoe
James McGuire
James Morrisroe
Margaret Mary Pearse

Re-elected TDs
Martin McDonogh
Michael Óg McFadden
Patrick O'Dowd

Outgoing TDs
Eamonn Duggan (Retired)
Margaret Collins-O'Driscoll (Lost seat)
Francis Gormley (Lost seat)
Patrick Gorry (Lost seat)
Raphael Keyes (Lost seat)
John Kiersey (Lost seat)
Joseph Mongan (Lost seat)
Fred McDonogh (Lost seat)
Eugene O'Brien (Lost seat)
Patrick O'Hara (Retired)
Martin Sexton (Lost seat)

Notes

References

 
General election, 1933
General election, 1933
1933
8th Dáil
January 1933 events